Iraq is a federal parliamentary representative democratic republic. It is a multi-party system whereby the executive power is exercised by the Prime Minister of the Council of Ministers as the head of government, the President of Iraq as the head of state, and legislative power is vested in the Council of Representatives.  

The current Prime Minister of Iraq is Mohammed Shia al-Sudani, who holds most of the executive authority and appointed the Council of Ministers, which acts as a cabinet and/or government.

The northern autonomous provinces, Kurdistan Region emerged in 1992 as an autonomous entity inside Iraq with its own local government and parliament.

Government

Federal government

The federal government of Iraq is defined under the current constitution as an Islamic, democratic, federal parliamentary republic. The federal government is composed of the executive, legislative, and judicial branches, as well as numerous independent commissions.

The legislative branch is composed of the Council of Representatives and a Federation Council. The executive branch is composed of the president, the prime minister, and the Council of Ministers. The federal judiciary is composed of the Higher Judicial Council, the Supreme Court, the Court of Cassation, the Public Prosecution Department, the Judiciary Oversight Commission, and other federal courts that are regulated by law. One such court is the Central Criminal Court.

The Independent High Commission for Human Rights, the Independent High Electoral Commission, and the Commission on Integrity are independent commissions subject to monitoring by the Council of Representatives. The Central Bank of Iraq, the Board of Supreme Audit, the Communications and Media Commission, and the Endowment Commission are financially and administratively independent institutions. The Foundation of Martyrs is attached to the Council of Ministers. The Federal Public Service Council regulates the affairs of the federal public service, including appointment and promotion.

Local government
The basic subdivisions of the country are the regions and the governorates. Both regions and  governorates are given broad autonomy with regions given additional powers such as control of internal security forces for the region such as police, security forces, and guards. The last local elections for the governorates were held in the 2009 Iraqi governorate elections on 31 January 2009.

Regions

The constitution requires that the Council of Representatives enact a law which provides the procedures for forming a new region 6 months from the start of its first session. A law was passed  11 October 2006 by a unanimous vote with only 138 of 275 representatives present, with the remaining representatives boycotting the vote. Legislators from the Iraqi Accord Front, Sadrist Movement and Islamic Virtue Party all opposed the bill.

Under the law, a region can be created out of one or more existing governorates or two or more existing regions, and a governorate can also join an existing region to create a new region. A new region can be proposed by one third or more of the council members in each affected governorate plus 500 voters or by one tenth or more voters in each affected governorate. A referendum must then be held within three months, which requires a simple majority in favour to pass. In the event of competing proposals, the multiple proposals are put to a ballot and the proposal with the most supporters is put to the referendum. In the event of an affirmative referendum a Transitional Legislative Assembly is elected for one year, which has the task of writing a constitution for the Region, which is then put to a referendum requiring a simple majority to pass. The President, Prime Minister and Ministers of the region are elected by simple majority, in contrast to the Iraqi Council of Representatives which requires two thirds support.

Provinces

Iraq is divided into 18 governorates, which are further divided into districts:

Political parties

Parliamentary alliances and parties
 National Iraqi Alliance
 Supreme Islamic Iraqi Council (al-Majlis al-alalith-thaura l-islamiyya fil-Iraq) – led by Ammar al-Hakim
 Sadrist Movement – led by Muqtada al-Sadr
 Islamic Dawa Party – Iraq Organisation (Hizb al-Da'wa al-Islami Tendeem al-Iraq) – led by Kasim Muhammad Taqi al-Sahlani
 Islamic Dawa Party (Hizb al-Da'wa al-Islamiyya) – led by Nouri al-Maliki
 Tribes of Iraq Coalition – led by Hamid al-Hais
 Islamic Fayli Grouping in Iraq – led by Muqdad Al-Baghdadi
 Democratic Patriotic Alliance of Kurdistan
 Kurdistan Democratic Party (Partiya Demokrat a Kurdistanê) – led by Massoud Barzani
 Patriotic Union of Kurdistan (Yaketi Nishtimani Kurdistan) – led by Jalal Talabani
 Kurdistan Islamic Union (Yekîtiya Islamiya Kurdistan)
 Movement for Change (Bizutnaway Gorran) – led by Nawshirwan Mustafa
 Kurdistan Toilers' Party (Parti Zahmatkeshan Kurdistan)
 Kurdistan Communist Party (Partiya Komunîst Kurdistan)
 Feyli Kurd Democratic Union (Yeketîa Demokrata Kurden Feylî)
 Assyrian Patriotic Party
 Civil Democratic Alliance
 People's Party led by Faiq Al Sheikh Ali.
 Iraqi Ummah Party led by Mithal Al-Alusi.
 Iraqi Liberal Party
 National Democratic Action Party
 Iraqi List (al-Qayimaal Iraqia)
 Iraqi National Accord – led by Iyad Allawi
 The Iraqis – led by Ghazi al-Yawer
 Iraqi Turkmen Front (Irak Türkmen Cephesi)) (same as Alliance of the Turkomen Front of Iraq?)
 National Independent Cadres and Elites
 People's Union (Ittihad Al Shaab)
 Iraqi Communist Party – led by Hamid Majid Mousa
 Islamic Kurdish Society – led by Ali Abd-al Aziz
 Islamic Labour Movement in Iraq
 National Democratic Party (Hizb al Dimuqratiyah al Wataniyah) – led by Samir al-Sumaidai
 National Rafidain List
 Assyrian Democratic Movement (Zowaa Dimuqrataya Aturaya) – led by Yonadam Kanna
 Reconciliation and Liberation Bloc
 The Upholders of the Message (Al-Risaliyun)
 Mithal al-Alusi List
 Yazidi Movement for Reform and Progress

Other parties
 Communist Party of Iraq
 Worker-Communist Party of Iraq
 Leftist Worker-Communist Party of Iraq
 Alliance of Independent Democrats – led by Adnan Pachachi
 National Democratic Party – Naseer al-Chaderchi
 Green Party of Iraq
 Iraqi Democratic Union 
 Iraqi National Accord
 Constitutional Monarchy Movement – led by Sharif Ali Bin al-Hussein
 Assyrian Patriotic Party – on the Democratic Patriotic Alliance of Kurdistan list
 Assyria Liberation Party
 Kurdistan Conservative Party
 Turkmen People's Party
 Iraqi Islamic Party – led by Ayad al-Samarrai
 Al Neshoor Party

Illegal parties
 Hizb ut-Tahrir
 Arab Socialist Ba'ath Party (Regional Command National Command)

Elections

Iraqi parliamentary election, January 2005

Elections for the National Assembly of Iraq were held on January 30, 2005 in Iraq. The 275-member National Assembly was a parliament created under the Transitional Law during the Occupation of Iraq. The newly elected transitional Assembly was given a mandate to write the new and permanent Constitution of Iraq and exercised legislative functions until the new Constitution came into effect, and resulted in the formation of the Iraqi Transitional Government.

The United Iraqi Alliance, tacitly backed by Shia Grand Ayatollah Ali al-Sistani, led with some 48% of the vote. The Democratic Patriotic Alliance of Kurdistan was in second place with some 26% of the vote. Prime Minister Ayad Allawi's party, the Iraqi List, came third with some 14%. In total, twelve parties received enough votes to win a seat in the assembly.

Low Arab Sunni turnout threatened the legitimacy of the election, which was as low as 2% in Anbar province. More than 100 armed attacks on polling places took place, killing at least 44 people (including nine suicide bombers) across Iraq, including at least 20 in Baghdad.

Iraqi parliamentary election, December 2005

Following the ratification of the Constitution of Iraq on 15 October 2005, a general election was held on 15 December to elect the permanent 275-member Iraqi Council of Representatives.

The elections took place under a list system, whereby voters chose from a list of parties and coalitions. 230 seats were apportioned among Iraq's 18 governorates based on the number of registered voters in each as of the January 2005 elections, including 59 seats for Baghdad Governorate. The seats within each governorate were allocated to lists through a system of Proportional Representation. An additional 45 "compensatory" seats were allocated to those parties whose percentage of the national vote total (including out of country votes) exceeds the percentage of the 275 total seats that they have been allocated. Women were required to occupy 25% of the 275 seats. The change in the voting system gave more weight to Arab Sunni voters, who make up most of the voters in several provinces. It was expected that these provinces would thus return mostly Sunni Arab representatives, after most Sunnis boycotted the last election.

Turnout was high (79.6%).  The White House was encouraged by the relatively low levels of violence during polling, with one insurgent group making good on a promised election day moratorium on attacks, even going so far as to guard the voters from attack. President Bush frequently pointed to the election as a sign of progress in rebuilding Iraq. However, post-election violence threatened to plunge the nation into civil war, before the situation began to calm in 2007. The election results themselves produced a shaky coalition government headed by Nouri al-Maliki.

Iraqi parliamentary election, 2010

A parliamentary election was held in Iraq on 7 March 2010. The election decided the 325 members of the Council of Representatives of Iraq who will elect the Iraqi Prime Minister and President. The election resulted in a partial victory for the Iraqi National Movement, led by former Interim Prime Minister Ayad Allawi, which won a total of 91 seats, making it the largest alliance in the council.  The State of Law Coalition, led by incumbent Prime Minister Nouri Al-Maliki, was the second largest grouping with 89 seats.

The election was rife with controversy. Prior to the election, the Supreme Court in Iraq ruled that the existing electoral law/rule was unconstitutional, and a new elections law made changes in the electoral system. On 15 January 2010, the Independent High Electoral Commission (IHEC) banned 499 candidates from the election due to alleged links with the Ba'ath Party. Before the start of the campaign on 12 February 2010, IHEC confirmed that most of the appeals by banned candidates had been rejected and 456 of the initially banned candidates would not be allowed to run for the election. There were numerous allegations of fraud, and a recount of the votes in Baghdad was ordered on 19 April 2010. On May 14, IHEC announced that after 11,298 ballot boxes had been recounted, there was no sign of fraud or violations.

The new parliament opened on 14 June 2010. After months of fraught negotiations, an agreement was reached on the formation of a new government on November 11. Talabani would continue as president, Al-Maliki would stay on as prime minister and Allawi would head a new security council.

Iraqi parliamentary election, 2014

Parliamentary elections were held in Iraq on 30 April 2014. The elections decided the 328 members of the Council of Representatives who will in turn elect the Iraqi President and Prime Minister.

Iraqi parliamentary election, 2018

Iraqi parliamentary election, 2021 

On 30 November 2021, the political bloc led by Shia leader Muqtada al-Sadr was confirmed the winner of the October parliamentary election. His Sadrist Movement, won a total of 73 out of the 329 seats in the parliament. The Taqadum, or Progress Party-led by Parliament Speaker Mohammed al-Halbousi, a Sunni – secured 37 seats. Former Prime Minister Nouri al-Maliki’s State of Law party got 33 seats in parliament. Al-Fatah alliance, whose main components are militia groups affiliated with the Iran-backed Popular Mobilisation Forces, sustained its crushing loss and snatched 17 seats. The Kurdistan Democratic Party (KDP) received 31 seats, and the Patriotic Union of Kurdistan (PUK) gained 18.

After the election 2022- 

In June 2022, 73 members of parliament from the Sadrist movement, resigned.
On 27 October 2022, Mohammed Shia al-Sudani, close ally of former Prime Minister Nouri al-Maliki, took the office to succeed  Mustafa al-Kadhimi as new Prime Minister of Iraq.

Issues

Corruption

According to Transparency International, Iraq's is the most corrupt government in the Middle East, and is described as a "hybrid regime" (between a "flawed democracy" and an "authoritarian regime"). The 2011 report "Costs of War" from Brown University's Watson Institute for International Studies concluded that U.S. military presence in Iraq has not been able to prevent this corruption, noting that as early as 2006, "there were clear signs that post-Saddam Iraq was not going to be the linchpin for a new democratic Middle East."

See also
 Assyrian politics in Iraq
 History of Iraq (2003–2011)
 Reconstruction of Iraq
 Human rights in post-invasion Iraq

References

Further reading
 Who Are Iraq's New Leaders? What Do They Want? U.S. Institute of Peace Special Report, March 2006
 BBC Report: Who's Who in Post-Saddam Iraq
 Video Seminar on Iraq Coalition Politics: April 20, 2005, sponsored by the Program in Arms Control, Disarmament, and International Security at the University of Illinois.
 M. Ismail Marcinkowski, Religion and Politics in Iraq. Shiite Clerics between Quietism and Resistance, with a foreword by Professor Hamid Algar of the University of California at Berkeley. Singapore: Pustaka Nasional, 2004
 State and society in Iraq ten years after regime change: the rise of a new authoritarianism  International Affairs (2013)

External links
 
 Global Justice Project: Iraq

 

bn:ইরাক#রাজনীতি